Saint Conrad may refer to:

 Saint Conrad of Constance (born c. 900–975), bishop and saint
 Saint Conrad of Pfullingen, of Trier (1035/1040–1066)
 Saint Conrad of Piacenza (1290–1351)
 Saint Conrad of Parzham (1818-1894), Franciscan Saint
 Blessed Conrad of Bavaria (born c. 1105–1126/1154)
Blessed Conrad of Offida (1290–1351), Italian Friar Minor preacher and founder of the Celestines.
 Blessed Conrad (Conn) O'Rourke (born c. 1542–1579), Franciscan martyr
 For Blessed Conrad of Seldenbüren [Sellenbüren] (died 2 May 1126), see Engelberg Abbey
 For Blessed Conrad II Bosinlother of Mondsee (born c. 1100–15 January 1145), see Mondsee Abbey
 For Blessed Conrad of Ottobeuren (died 27 July 1227), see Ottobeuren Abbey